Mansfield Woodhouse railway station serves the settlement of Mansfield Woodhouse, which adjoins the town of Mansfield, both located in Nottinghamshire, England.

The station is on the Robin Hood Line between Nottingham and Worksop. It was originally closed in 1964 but was reopened in 1995.

History
The original station was opened for goods traffic in April 1875 and for passenger traffic on 1 June 1875 when the Midland Railway built a  branch line from Mansfield to Worksop. Stations were erected at Mansfield Woodhouse, Shirebrook, Langwith, Cresswell and Whitwell. They were all built of stone except for the one at Mansfield Woodhouse, which was built entirely in wood.

Stationmasters
Joseph Harrison 1875 – 1899 (formerly station master at Stretton)
Frederick Mason 1899 – 1923 (formerly station master at Burton Joyce)

Branch line
A branch line veered west approximately half a mile north of the station. This single track line, known as "The Pleasley extension", ran through Pleasley Vale to  station, and then it split into two.

It closed to normal passenger traffic in 1930 and the section between Pleasley and Glapwell was lifted. Coal continued to go out northwards from Glapwell Colliery until it closed in 1974.

The other line continued south west through Teversal and Tibshelf to Westhouses. That line also lost its sparse passenger service in 1930, but remarkably, excursions and summer specials called at Pleasley West and Mansfield Woodhouse up to 1963. The line between Pleasley West and the junction north of Mansfield Woodhouse was closed and lifted in 1964 after which coal from the collieries on the line all went southwards to Westhouses.  One by one these collieries closed and all tracks through Pleasley West became redundant and were lifted.

Parts of the trackbed and those of neighbouring lines have been turned into public footpaths and bridleways.

Services
All services at Mansfield Woodhouse are operated by East Midlands Railway.

During the peak hours, the station is also served by an additional two trains per day to and from Nottingham which start and terminate at Mansfield Woodhouse.

On Sundays, the station is served by a two-hourly service to Nottingham, with no service to Worksop. Sunday services to Worksop are due to recommence at the station during the life of the East Midlands franchise.

References

External links

Railway stations in Nottinghamshire
DfT Category F2 stations
Railway stations opened by Railtrack
Railway stations in Great Britain opened in 1875
Railway stations in Great Britain closed in 1964
Railway stations in Great Britain opened in 1995
Railway stations served by East Midlands Railway
Reopened railway stations in Great Britain
Former Midland Railway stations
Mansfield District
Beeching closures in England